13P may refer to:

 SpaceShipOne flight 13P, a flight of SpaceShip One
 13P/Olbers, a comet

See also
 P13 (disambiguation)